The International Broadcast Centre (IBC) is a temporary hub for broadcasters during major sport events. It is also known as the International Press Center (IPC) or Main Press Center (MPC).

FIFA World Cup

IBC/MPC host cities

1958:  – Gothenburg 
1962:  – Santiago
1966:  – London 
1970:  – Mexico City
1974:  – Munich
1978:  – Buenos Aires
1982:  – Madrid
1986:  – Mexico City
1990:  – Rome
1994:  – Dallas and Los Angeles
1998:  – Paris
2002:
  – Seoul
  – Yokohama
2006:  – Munich
2010:  – Johannesburg
2014:  – Rio de Janeiro
2018:  – Moscow
2022:  – Doha
2026: 
  – Toronto
  – Los Angeles
  – Mexico City

2006 edition in Munich

During the 2006 FIFA World Cup in Germany, the IBC in Munich was host to journalists from around 190 countries. The centre was based at the Munich Fairgrounds, in what was formally Munich Airport. The building is now known as the Munich Exhibition Centre. 120 television and radio channels had broadcast images and reports of the World Cup, from the centre to the 190 countries that they serve. Each channel had an allocated space on the floor, which were separated by wooden panels.

UEFA European Football Championship
During the UEFA Euro 2016, in France, the IBC in Paris was host to journalists from around 190 countries.
120 television and radio channels had broadcast images and reports of the European Football Championship, from the centre to the 190 countries that they serve. Each channel had a space on the 30,000 square meter floor, separated by wooden panels.

IBC/MPC host cities
1996:  – London
2000:
  – Brussels
  – Amsterdam
2004:  – Lisbon
2008:
  – Basel 
  – Vienna
2012:
  – Warsaw
  – Kyiv
2016:  – Paris
2020:  – Vijfhuizen
2024:  – Munich

Olympic Games

An International Broadcast Centre is created at every Olympic Games. Broadcasters from around the world build studios in what is generally a large conference centre, such as the Georgia World Congress Center, which was used for the Atlanta Games. Olympic Broadcasting Services provides each of these rights-holders a video and audio feed from each venue, beauty shots from around the Olympic venues, transmission facilities, etc.

The inaugural IBC was created for the Tokyo 1964 Summer Olympics during the inaugural Olympics to be broadcast around the world.

Notes

References

External links

Sports television
Olympics on television
Olympic International Broadcast Centres